Tasgius ater is a species of large rove beetle in the family Staphylinidae.

References

Further reading

External links

 

Staphylininae
Beetles described in 1802